The Pines is a historic home located at the hamlet of Pine Plains in the town of Pine Plains, Dutchess County, New York.  It was built in 1878 and is a large 2-story frame residence with a -story service wing designed in the Stick-Eastlake style.  It has an asymmetrical appearance with projecting bays, cross gables, and porches.  It features a steeply pitched, common lap slate roof, four corbeled chimney stacks with terra cotta pots, and a tower with a steeply pitched pyramidal roof.

It was added to the National Register of Historic Places in 1983.

See also

National Register of Historic Places listings in Dutchess County, New York

References

Houses on the National Register of Historic Places in New York (state)
Queen Anne architecture in New York (state)
Houses completed in 1878
Houses in Dutchess County, New York
National Register of Historic Places in Dutchess County, New York